John Gribbel (March 29, 1858 – August 25, 1936) was an American businessman, industrialist and philanthropist. He is best remembered for his donation of the  Glenriddell Manuscripts to the National Library of Scotland.

Biography
John Gribbel was born March 29, 1858, in Hudson City, (now known as Jersey City), New Jersey, the son of James Gribbel, a manufacturer of mining equipment, and Anna West Simmons, his wife. Both parents were born in Cornwall, England and emigrated to the United States in 1838.

After preparatory courses of study, he entered the College of the City of New York, remaining until 1876. In that year he found employment in the Importers' and Traders' National Bank of New York City, transferring his services, in 1877, to the Leather Manufacturers' Bank in the same city. After remaining with the latter institution until 1883, Gribbel went to Philadelphia as agent for Harris, Griffin & Company, manufacturers of gas meters. In 1890 the firm was reorganized under the name John J. Griffin & Company, and Gribbel was admitted to a junior partnership. Two years later, Griffin died and Gribbel became sole owner of the business, which continued under the same name and ownership and was notably successful.

Gas, electricity and other business interests

After becoming head of this concern, the sphere of his interests gradually widened to such an extent as to assume a national character and to include gas, electric and street railway utilities, operating in several parts of the United States. Among the most prominent of Gribbel's gas interests was the Brooklyn Borough Gas Company, of which he was vice-president. He was president of the Royal Electrotype Company, and a director of the Girard National Bank, the Real Estate Trust Company, the Pennsylvania Sugar Company and the National Properties Company, which controlled among other projects the Wilmington and Chester railways and the American Railways System. From 1907, he was president of the Fairmount Savings Trust Company until that company was absorbed by a larger financial institution. Gribbel was also a director of the United Gas and Electric Corporation of New York; president of the Tampa Gas Company, Florida; the Helena Gas and Electric Company, Arkansas; the Corpus Christi Electric Company, Texas; and the Athens Gas Company, Georgia. He was a member of the American Gas Institute and the Association of Illuminating Engineers.

Residences

One of Gribbells residences was St. Austel Hall in Wyncote, Pennsylvania, designed by architect Horace Trumbauer and built between 1899 and 1900 by George F. Payne and Company of Philadelphia at a cost of $74,000. The design was based on an English manor named Kelmscott House, which had been owned by William Morris. It was named for St Austell, Cornwall, his mother's former home before immigrating to the United States. The house included a library, billiard room and a built-in pipe organ. It was located on a 42-acre estate. The house was demolished in the 1950s to make way for a housing project. Only the gardener's cottage remains.

John Gribbel also owned a summer cottage named "Weatherend" on Deadman Point in Rockport, Maine.

Litigation
In Gribbel v. Brown (1900) 9 Pa. Dist. 524 and Harris v. Brown (1900) 9 Pa. Dist. 521, which were tried at the same time, the court ruled against Gribbel on the grounds that his lawsuit was champerty. ("The distinguishing feature of champerty is the support of litigation by a stranger in return for a share of the proceeds.")

Publishing
Many years previously, Gribbel became interested in the Curtis Publishing Company, of Philadelphia, of which he became a director, and so had a close business and personal association with Cyrus H. K. Curtis for a long time before they purchased, in partnership, the Public Ledger of Philadelphia. This was at the end of 1912. In September 1914, Gribbel severed his connection, resigning the office of vice-president and leaving the management wholly in the hands of Curtis.

Politics
Politically Mr. Gribbel was an independent Republican, and in December 1914, was elected president of the Union League, retiring at the expiration of three terms in that office. His other clubs were the Lotos Club, of New York; the University Club of Philadelphia, Art Club, City Club, Five O'Clock Club and Bachelors' Barge Club, all of Philadelphia. He belonged to the Historical Society of Pennsylvania, serving as a member of the council. His religious membership was in the Methodist Episcopal Church, and he was a trustee of Wesleyan University, Middletown, Connecticut, which university conferred upon him the degree of Master of Arts. He was also a trustee of Hackettstown Collegiate Institute in Hackettstown, NJ. He received also from Temple University of Philadelphia the honorary degree of LL.D.

An address about Abraham Lincoln, delivered by Gribbel at the annual dinner of the Union League on February 12, 1915, was later printed and published by the League.

History and the Glenriddell Manuscripts
Apart from business Gribbel's greatest interest was in the study and collection of American Colonial historical documents and of seventeenth-century English books and engravings. He gave lectures on these subjects, notably, one on Robert Burns which he delivered before the Historical Society of Pennsylvania.

In December 1913, Gribbel forever endeared himself to every loyal Scot at home and abroad by purchasing and giving to Scotland under a deed of trust the priceless Glenriddell Manuscripts of the poet Robert Burns. These two volumes, strongly bound in calf, comprise the largest collection of Burns manuscripts in existence, and contain the letters and a selected number of poems which he wrote out and presented to his friend and patron, Robert Riddell of Glenriddell, in 1791. The dedication is considered one of the best pieces, of prose from the poet’s hand. When Riddell died, in 1794, the two volumes passed back to "Bonnie Jean," Burns’s widow, and were given by her to Dr. Currie to be used by him in connection with the preparation of his edition of the poet’s works. In 1853, fifty-seven years after Burns ‘s death, they were placed by the widow of Dr. Currie’s son in the keeping of the Liverpool Athenaeum Library. On the fly-leaf of the volume of letters is pasted the original letter of presentation from Mrs. S. Currie. In the summer of 1913, the trustees of the library sold the volumes to an unknown dealer. Some months afterward, in November 1913, the manuscripts were offered to Gribbel in Philadelphia by a broker, and December 1, 1913, at the annual banquet of the St. Andrew’s Society of Philadelphia, he announced amid applause that he had bought them with the purpose of returning them to the people of Scotland.

Gribbel presented them to the Scots people in perpetual trusteeship, to be held alternately five years by Edinburgh and Glasgow.

Gribbel also owned the Robert Burns's Interleaved Scots Musical Museum that had been produced for Captain Robert Riddell.

Marriage
Gribbel married Elizabeth Bancker (May 17, 1860 – July 1, 1934), daughter of Arnold and Sarah Louise (Reynolds) Wood, on January 8, 1880, and they had the following children: Wakeman Griffin (d. December 11, 1946), Idella L., John Bancker (1916–1997) and Elizabeth.

There are several recipes by Mrs. John Gribbel in The Philadelphia New Century Club Book of Recipes (1915). These include, "Mother's Mutton Broth", "New Amsterdam Molasses Cake", "Rhode Island Rice Pudding" and "Strawberry Sauce".

On January 17, 1929, Maj. W. Griffin Gribbel, just released from a sanatorium where he was being treated for shell-shock  (PTSD), caused by his experiences in World War I, shot and killed Inspector of Police, John W. Blackburn. Gribbel was himself shot four times but survived. He was charged with first-degree murder and the case went to trial in February 1930. Gribbel was acquitted by a Philadelphia jury, two days later,  on the grounds of insanity.

W.G. Gribbel had previously been in trouble with the law in 1905, when he was twenty-four and a student in the engineering department at the University of Pennsylvania. He was arraigned in the West Side Court, New York, on charges that he had attempted suicide after having appeared in the Astor Hotel under the influence of an unidentified drug. Griffin had been taken to the Roosevelt Hospital in a stupor. His parents were travelling in Mexico at the time and Robert Haines, who served as the family butler at their palatial estate in Wyncote, PA, was present in court when he was arraigned. Griffin denied that he had attempted suicide, claiming that he had taken the drug "to sleep", and was discharged by the magistrate in the care of Haines.

References

American philanthropists
American industrialists
American bankers
Natural gas companies of the United States
People from Jersey City, New Jersey